Brian Scott Robinson (born December 7, 1965) is a United States Air Force lieutenant general who has served as commander of the Air Education and Training Command since May 20, 2022. He previously served as the deputy commander of the Air Mobility Command. 

Robinson was born in 1965 and raised in Philadelphia, Pennsylvania; his father, William served in the United States Army. He attended the Philadelphia High School of Engineering and Philadelphia University, earning a Bachelor's degree in computer science in 1987.

In July 2020, the United States Senate confirmed his promotion to lieutenant general and nomination to become the deputy commander of Air Mobility Command, replacing Lieutenant General Jacqueline Van Ovost, who was set to become commander of the major command.

Awards and decorations

Effective dates of promotions

References

Living people
1960s births
Place of birth missing (living people)
Thomas Jefferson University alumni
Air University (United States Air Force) alumni
Webster University alumni
Dwight D. Eisenhower School for National Security and Resource Strategy alumni
United States Air Force generals
Lieutenant generals
Recipients of the Air Force Distinguished Service Medal
Recipients of the Defense Superior Service Medal
Recipients of the Legion of Merit